Humanistic naturalism is the branch of philosophical naturalism wherein human beings are best able to control and understand the world through use of the scientific method, combined with the social and ethical values of humanism. Concepts of spirituality, intuition, and metaphysics are considered subjectively valuable only, primarily because they are unfalsifiable, and therefore can never progress beyond the realm of personal opinion. A boundary is not drawn between nature and what lies "beyond" nature; everything is regarded as a result of explainable processes within nature, with nothing lying outside it. 
 
The belief is that all living things are intricate extensions of nature, and therefore deserve some degree of mutual respect from human beings. Naturalists accept the need for adaptation to current change, however it may be, and also that life must feed upon life for survival. However, they also recognize the necessity for a fair exchange of resources between all species. Humanistic naturalists are generally concerned with the ethical aspects of "worldview naturalism."
 	
Industry and technology are sometimes regarded as enemies to naturalism, but this is not always the case. For those who do believe in such threats, the thought is that the majority of human history, societies were largely agricultural and hunter-gatherer and lived in relative harmony and balance with nature. With the dawn of the Industrial Revolution, some humanistic naturalists see this balance as being increasingly threatened. This view has some similarities with anarcho-primitivism and other anti-modernist perspectives.

See also
Positivism
Secular humanism

References 

 Titus, Harold H. Living Issues in Philosophy (4th ed.; New York: American Book Company, 1963). 
 American Humanist Association, What is Humanism?

Humanism
Philosophy of science
Naturalism (philosophy)
Metaphysical theories